The Taita shrew (Suncus aequatorius) is an extant species of white-toothed shrew from two localities in the Taita Hills mountain range in the Taita-Taveta District of southwestern Kenya. Given the continuing decline in the quality of this habitat, and the limitations in its range, the IUCN recognises the shrew as an endangered species.

References

Further reading
Aggundey, I. R. and Schlitter, D. A. (1986). Annotated checklist of the mammals of Kenya. II. Insectivora and Macroscelidea. Annals of Carnegie Museum 55: 325-347.
Heim de Balsac, H. and Meester, J. (1977). Order Insectivora. In: J. Meester and H. W. Setzer (eds), The Mammals of Africa: An Identification Manual, pp. 1–29. Smithsonian Institution Press, Washington, D. C., USA.
Oguge, N., Hutterer, R. Odhiambo, R. and Verheyen, W. (2004). Diversity and structure of shrew communities in montane forests of southeast Kenya. Mammalian Biology 69: 289-301.

Suncus
Endemic fauna of Kenya
Mammals of Kenya
Mammals described in 1912
Taxa named by Edmund Heller